The Repeal Act of 1782 (22. Geo. 3. c. 53) was an Act of the Parliament of Great Britain, which repealed the Declaratory Act of 1719. The 1719 Act had declared the Parliament of Ireland dependent on the Parliament and Privy Council of Great Britain; the Repeal Act was the first part of the Constitution of 1782, which granted legislative independence to the Kingdom of Ireland. It was passed after the resignation of the North Ministry, which had overseen defeat in the American War of Independence. The Irish Patriot Party and Irish Volunteers had demanded greater autonomy, and the new Rockingham Ministry conceded in fear of an American-style revolt. The Irish Parliament subsequently passed Yelverton's Act to amend Poynings' Law, the Irish statute which had given the British (and before that the English) Privy Council advance oversight over legislation to be proposed to the Irish Parliament.

While Henry Grattan was satisfied with the 1782 repeal, Henry Flood demanded further that Britain positively renounce any right to legislate for Ireland; this was secured by the Irish Appeals Act 1783 (or "Renunciation Act").

References

Sources
The Law & Working of the Constitution: Documents 1660-1914, ed. W. C. Costin & J. Steven Watson. A&C Black, 1952. Vol. I (1660-1783).
  
 
The text of the act

Great Britain Acts of Parliament 1782
Repealed Great Britain Acts of Parliament